This is a list of cartoons featuring the Warner Bros. cartoon character Sylvester.

Original shorts

1945 
 Life with Feathers (3/24/1945, MM) - First appearance of Sylvester; directed by Friz Freleng
 Peck Up Your Troubles (10/20/1945, MM) - Directed by Friz Freleng

1946 
 Kitty Kornered (6/8/1946, LT) - First pairing of Sylvester and Porky Pig; directed by Robert Clampett; only Sylvester cartoon to be solely directed by Robert Clampett

1947 
 Tweetie Pie (5/3/1947, MM) - First pairing of Sylvester and Tweety; directed by Friz Freleng
 Crowing Pains (7/12/1947, LT) - Only pairing of Sylvester and Foghorn Leghorn and Barnyard Dawg; first pairing of Sylvester and Henery Hawk; directed by Robert McKimson
 Doggone Cats (10/25/1947, MM) - Directed by Arthur Davis
 Catch as Cats Can (12/6/1947, MM) - Directed by Arthur Davis

1948 
 Back Alley Oproar (3/27/1948, MM) - First pairing of Sylvester and Elmer Fudd; directed by Friz Freleng
 I Taw a Putty Tat (4/3/1948, MM) - Starring Tweety; directed by Friz Freleng
 Hop, Look and Listen (4/17/1948, LT) - First appearance of Hippety Hopper; directed by Robert McKimson
 Kit for Cat (11/6/1948, LT) - Starring Elmer Fudd; directed by Friz Freleng
 Scaredy Cat (12/18/1948, MM) - Starring Porky Pig; directed by Chuck Jones

1949 
 Mouse Mazurka (6/11/1949, MM) - Directed by Friz Freleng
 Bad Ol' Putty Tat (7/23/1949, MM) - Starring Tweety; directed by Friz Freleng
 Hippety Hopper (11/19/1949, MM) - Starring Hippety Hopper; directed by Robert McKimson

1950 
 Home, Tweet Home (1/14/1950, MM) - Starring Tweety; directed by Friz Freleng
 The Scarlet Pumpernickel (3/4/1950, LT) - Starring Daffy Duck, Porky Pig, Elmer Fudd, Henery Hawk and others; first pairing of Sylvester and Daffy Duck; final pairing of Sylvester and Henery Hawk; directed by Chuck Jones
 All a Bir-r-r-d (6/24/1950, LT) - Starring Tweety; directed by Friz Freleng
 Canary Row (10/7/1950, MM) - Starring Tweety; first appearance of Granny; directed by Friz Freleng
 Stooge for a Mouse (10/21/1950, MM) - Directed by Friz Freleng
 Pop 'Im Pop! (10/28/1950, LT) - Starring Hippety Hopper; first appearance of Sylvester Jr.; directed by Robert McKimson

1951 
 Canned Feud (2/3/1951, LT) - Directed by Friz Freleng
 Putty Tat Trouble (2/24/1951, LT) - Starring Tweety; directed by Friz Freleng
 Room and Bird (6/2/1951, MM) - Starring Tweety; directed by Friz Freleng
 Tweety's S.O.S. (9/22/1951, MM) - Starring Tweety; directed by Friz Freleng
 Tweet Tweet Tweety (12/15/1951, LT) - Starring Tweety; directed by Friz Freleng

1952 
 Who's Kitten Who? (1/5/1952, LT) - Starring Hippety Hopper and Sylvester Jr.; directed by Robert McKimson
 Gift Wrapped (2/16/1952, LT) - Starring Tweety; directed by Friz Freleng
 Little Red Rodent Hood (5/3/1952, MM) - Directed by Friz Freleng
 Ain't She Tweet (6/21/1952, LT) - Starring Tweety; directed by Friz Freleng
 Hoppy Go Lucky (8/9/1952, LT) - Starring Hippety Hopper; directed by Robert McKimson
 A Bird In A Guilty Cage (8/30/1952, LT) - Starring Tweety; directed by Friz Freleng
 Tree for Two (10/4/1952, MM) - First appearance of Spike the Bulldog and Chester the Terrier; directed by Friz Freleng

1953 
 Snow Business (1/17/1953, LT) - Starring Tweety; directed by Friz Freleng
 A Mouse Divided (1/31/1953, MM) - Directed by Friz Freleng
 Fowl Weather (4/4/1953, MM) - Starring Tweety; directed by Friz Freleng
 Tom Tom Tomcat (6/27/1953, MM) - Starring Tweety; directed by Friz Freleng
 A Street Cat Named Sylvester (9/5/1953, LT) - Starring Tweety; directed by Friz Freleng
 Catty Cornered (10/31/1953, MM) - Starring Tweety; directed by Friz Freleng
 Cats a-Weigh (11/28/1953, MM) - Starring Hippety Hopper and Sylvester Jr.; directed by Robert McKimson

1954 
 Dog Pounded (1/2/1954, LT) - Starring Tweety; a cameo by Pepé Le Pew; only Sylvester and Pepé Le Pew pairing; directed by Friz Freleng
 Bell Hoppy (4/17/1954, MM) - Starring Hippety Hopper; directed by Robert McKimson
 Dr. Jerkyl's Hide (5/8/1954, LT) - Final appearance of Spike the Bulldog and Chester the Terrier; directed by Friz Freleng
 Claws for Alarm (5/22/1954, MM) - Starring Porky Pig; directed by Chuck Jones
 Muzzle Tough (6/26/1954, MM) - Starring Tweety; directed by Friz Freleng
 Satan's Waitin' (8/7/1954, LT) - Starring Tweety; directed by Friz Freleng
 By Word of Mouse (10/2/1954, LT) - Directed by Friz Freleng

1955 
 Lighthouse Mouse (3/12/1955, MM) - Starring Hippety Hopper; directed by Robert McKimson
 Sandy Claws (4/2/1955, LT) - Starring Tweety; directed by Friz Freleng
 Tweety's Circus (6/4/1955, MM) - Starring Tweety; directed by Friz Freleng
 Jumpin' Jupiter (8/6/1955, MM) - Final pairing of Sylvester and Porky Pig; directed by Chuck Jones
 A Kiddie's Kitty (8/20/1955, MM) - Directed by Friz Freleng
 Speedy Gonzales (9/17/1955, MM) - First pairing of Sylvester and Speedy Gonzales; directed by Friz Freleng
 Red Riding Hoodwinked (10/29/1955, LT) - Starring Tweety; directed by Friz Freleng
 Heir-Conditioned (11/26/1955, LT) - Starring Elmer Fudd; directed by Friz Freleng
 Pappy's Puppy (12/17/1955, MM) - Directed by Friz Freleng

1956 
 Too Hop To Handle (1/28/1956, LT) - Starring Hippety Hopper and Sylvester Jr.; directed by Robert McKimson
 Tweet and Sour (3/24/1956, LT) - Starring Tweety; directed by Friz Freleng
 Tree Cornered Tweety (5/19/1956, MM) - Starring Tweety; directed by Friz Freleng
 The Unexpected Pest (6/2/1956, MM) - Directed by Robert McKimson
 Tugboat Granny (6/23/1956, MM) - Starring Tweety; directed by Friz Freleng
 The Slap-Hoppy Mouse (9/1/1956, MM) - Starring Hippety Hopper and Sylvester Jr.; directed by Robert McKimson
 Yankee Dood It (10/13/1956, MM) - Final pairing of Sylvester and Elmer Fudd; directed by Friz Freleng

1957 
 Tweet Zoo (1/12/1957, MM) - Starring Tweety; directed by Friz Freleng
 Tweety and the Beanstalk (5/16/1957, MM) - Starring Tweety; directed by Friz Freleng
 Birds Anonymous (8/10/1957, MM) - Starring Tweety; directed by Friz Freleng
 Greedy for Tweety (9/28/1957, LT) - Starring Tweety; directed by Friz Freleng
 Mouse-Taken Identity (11/16/1957, MM) - Starring Hippety Hopper and Sylvester Jr.; directed by Robert McKimson
 Gonzales' Tamales (11/30/1957, LT) - Starring Speedy Gonzales; directed by Friz Freleng

1958 
 A Pizza Tweety Pie (2/22/1958, LT) - Starring Tweety; directed by Friz Freleng
 A Bird in a Bonnet (9/27/1958, MM) - Starring Tweety; directed by Friz Freleng

1959 
 Trick or Tweet (3/21/1959, MM) - Starring Tweety; directed by Friz Freleng
 Tweet and Lovely (7/18/1959, MM) - Starring Tweety; directed by Friz Freleng
 Cat's Paw (8/15/1959, LT) - Starring Sylvester Jr.; directed by Robert McKimson
 Here Today, Gone Tamale (8/29/1959, LT) - Starring Speedy Gonzales; directed by Friz Freleng
 Tweet Dreams (12/5/1959, LT) - Starring Tweety; directed by Friz Freleng

1960 
 West of the Pesos (1/23/1960, MM) - Starring Speedy Gonzales; directed by Robert McKimson
 Goldimouse and the Three Cats (3/15/1960, LT) - Starring Sylvester Jr.; directed by Friz Freleng
 Hyde and Go Tweet (5/14/1960, MM) - Starring Tweety; directed by Friz Freleng
 Mouse and Garden (7/16/1960, LT) - Directed by Friz Freleng
 Trip For Tat (10/29/1960, MM) - Starring Tweety; directed by Friz Freleng

1961 
 Cannery Woe (1/7/1961, LT) - Starring Speedy Gonzales; directed by Robert McKimson
 Hoppy Daze (2/11/1961, LT) - Starring Hippety Hopper; directed by Robert McKimson
 Birds of a Father (4/1/1961, LT) - Starring Sylvester Jr.; directed by Robert McKimson
 D' Fightin' Ones (4/22/1961, MM) - Directed by Friz Freleng
 Rebel Without Claws (7/15/1961, LT) - Starring Tweety; directed by Friz Freleng
 The Pied Piper of Guadalupe (8/19/1961, LT) - Starring Speedy Gonzales; directed by Friz Freleng
 The Last Hungry Cat (12/2/1961, MM) - Starring Tweety; directed by Friz Freleng

1962 
 Fish and Slips (3/10/1962, LT) - Starring Sylvester Jr.; directed by Robert McKimson
 Mexican Boarders (5/12/1962, LT) - Starring Speedy Gonzales; directed by Friz Freleng
 The Jet Cage (9/22/1962, LT) - Starring Tweety; directed by Friz Freleng

1963 
 Mexican Cat Dance (4/20/1963, LT) - Starring Speedy Gonzales; directed by Friz Freleng
 Chili Weather (8/17/1963, MM) - Starring Speedy Gonzales; directed by Friz Freleng
 Claws in the Lease (11/9/1963, MM) - Starring Sylvester Jr.; directed by Robert McKimson

1964 
 A Message to Gracias (2/8/1964, LT) - Starring Speedy Gonzales; directed by Robert McKimson
 Freudy Cat (3/14/1964, LT) - Final pairing of Sylvester and Hippety Hopper; final pairing of Sylvester and Sylvester Jr.; directed by McKimson
 Nuts and Volts (4/25/1964, LT) - Starring Speedy Gonzales; directed by Friz Freleng
 Hawaiian Aye Aye (4/25/1964, MM) - Directed by Gerry Chiniquy); only Sylvester and Tweety cartoon to be directed by Gerry Chiniquy; final pairing of Sylvester and Tweety
 Road To Andalay (12/26/1964, MM) - Starring Speedy Gonzales; directed by Friz Freleng and Hawley Pratt; first DePatie-Freleng Enterprises Sylvester cartoon

1965 
 It's Nice to Have a Mouse Around the House (1/16/1965, LT) - Starring Speedy Gonzales and Daffy Duck; directed by Friz Freleng
 Cats and Bruises (1/30/1965, MM) - Starring Speedy Gonzales; directed by Friz Freleng and Hawley Pratt; final cartoon in which Sylvester speaks
 The Wild Chase (2/27/1965, MM) - Only pairing of Sylvester and Wile E. Coyote and the Road Runner; directed by Friz Freleng, Chuck Jones (some footage)

1966 
 A Taste of Catnip (12/3/1966, MM) - Final pairing of Sylvester and Speedy Gonzales; also final pairing of Sylvester and Daffy Duck; final Looney Tunes appearance of Sylvester and his final short; final DePatie-Freleng Enterprises Sylvester cartoon; directed by Robert McKimson

Post-golden age media featuring Sylvester 
 Bugs Bunny's Christmas Carol (1979)
 The Yolk's on You (1980)
 Who Framed Roger Rabbit (cameo, 1988)
 Carrotblanca, voiced by Joe Alaskey (1995)
 The Sylvester & Tweety Mysteries (1995-2002)
 Space Jam, voiced by Bill Farmer (1996)
 Father of the Bird, voiced by Joe Alaskey (1998)
 Tweety's High-Flying Adventure (2000)
 Baby Looney Tunes, voiced by Terry Klassen (2002-2005)
 Baby Looney Tunes' Eggs-traordinary Adventure, voiced by Terry Klassen (2003)
 Looney Tunes: Back in Action, voiced by Joe Alaskey (2003)
 Museum Scream, voiced by Jeff Bennett (2004)
 Bah, Humduck! A Looney Tunes Christmas, voiced by Joe Alaskey (2006)
 The Looney Tunes Show, voiced by Jeff Bergman (2011-2013)
 I Tawt I Taw a Puddy Tat, voiced by Mel Blanc (from archival recordings) (2011)
 Flash in the Pain (cameo, 2014)
 New Looney Tunes, voiced by Jeff Bergman (2017-2020)
 Looney Tunes Cartoons, voiced by Jeff Bergman (2020-present)
 Teen Titans Go! See Space Jam, voiced by Bill Farmer (from archival recordings) (2021)
 Space Jam: A New Legacy, voiced by Jeff Bergman (2021)
 King Tweety, voiced by Eric Bauza (2022)
 Bugs Bunny Builders, voiced by Jeff Bergman (2022-present)

Webtoons 
 "Twick or Tweety"
 "Aluminium Chef - Sylvester Cat vs. Tweety Bird"
 "Judge Granny - Case 2: Tweety vs. Sylvester"
 "Full Metal Racket"
 "Malltown and Tazboy" (cameo)
 "Mysterious Phenomena of the Unexplained - #1 Sufferin' Sasquatch"
 "Mysterious Phenomena of the Unexplained - #5 The Bermuda Short"
 "Toon Marooned" series
 "The Junkyard Run" (parts 1-3)
 "Sports Blab" (numbers 1 and 2}

References

Sylvester J. Pussycat, Sr.
Sylvester J. Pussycat, Sr.